Punkaharju Airfield is an airfield in Punkaharju, Savonlinna, Finland, about  south of Punkaharju municipal centre.

See also
List of airports in Finland

References

External links
 Lentopaikat.fi – Punkaharju Airfield

Airports in Finland
Airfield
Buildings and structures in South Savo